The Czech TV crisis occurred at the end of 2000 and lasted until February 2001 as a battle for control of the airwaves, which included jamming and accusations of censorship. On 24 December 2000, news programs on Česká televize (ČT) were interrupted by Jana Bobošíková, a veteran presenter at the channel and the newly appointed head of the news department, sitting next to Jiří Hodač, a former BBC employee who had been appointed general manager of ČT on 20 December.

Description
During the Czech TV crisis, ČT reporters organized an industrial dispute by staging a sit-in and occupying the news studio, and rejected attempts by Bobošíková to fire them. They were supported in their protest by politicians such as the then President Václav Havel and by Czech celebrities, but every time they tried to air their news broadcasts, Jana Bobošíková and Jiří Hodač would interrupt the transmission either with a "technical fault" screen reading: "An unauthorized signal has entered this transmitter. Broadcasting will resume in a few minutes," or with their own news broadcasts featuring Jana Bobošíková and a team she had hired to "replace" the staff members she had sought to terminate; news content from Bratislava was also rebroadcast.

These broadcasts began being referred to as "Bobovize" by the disputing TV reporters and their supporters who opposed the new management. On the other hand, throughout the crisis, Bobošíková's supporters, such as Václav Klaus and the then Czech Prime Minister Miloš Zeman, accused the protesting ČT reporters of law infringement and claimed that those reporters who rejected the changes were not so independent after all. Vladimír Železný also criticized the ČT reporters during his show on TV Nova, "Call the Director".

Following the "technical fault" screens and prevention of the news broadcasts by Bobošíková tens of thousands of people marched in the streets of Prague and other Czech cities and towns, calling for restoration of freedom of the press, demanding an end to what they perceived as censorship at ČT. The demonstrations even drew support from the International Federation of Journalists and made world headlines. The demonstrators also demanded Bobošíková's resignation and the dismissal of the allegedly biased general manager Jiří Hodač. Hodač was even briefly hospitalized during the events.

Hodač resigned shortly after the demonstrations, citing health reasons, but the protesters vowed to continue their demonstrations in order to push for more resignations and a change in the law. The lower house of the Czech Parliament, the Chamber of Deputies of the Parliament of the Czech Republic, subsequently sacked the supervisory board of Česká televize, but a number of executives including Bobošíková refused to resign. The Chamber of Deputies then took control of Česká televize on a temporary basis until a General Director could be appointed. The Czech TV crisis eventually ended in February 2001, following the departure of the remaining executives.

Many of the reporters who rebelled against Bobošíková are still at Česká televize today; Jiří Janeček, one of the news anchors who occupied the studio in protest, was later elected Director General, a role he held until 2011. Jana Bobošíková was later hired to moderate the political discussion program Sedmička on private TV Nova. She was elected a member of the European Parliament in 2004 on Železný's ticket but soon split with him.

See also 
 Česká televize
 Television in the Czech Republic

References

External links 
 Czech TV Crisis Continues – news from Czech Radio 7 (Radio Prague)
 Czech TV Crisis Continues 2 – news from Czech Radio 7 (Radio Prague)
 Mediachannel
 Made-for-TV Revolution – critical analysis in Central European Review
 TV Journalists Strike Over Political Interference – info on the IFEX pages
 ČT odmítla vysílat dokument o své krizi (CT Refused to Broadcast the Document About its Crisis) 

Protests in the Czech Republic
Television in the Czech Republic
Censorship of broadcasting
2000 in the Czech Republic
2000 in Czech television
2001 in the Czech Republic
2001 in Czech television
Czech Television